Celac or CELAC may refer to:

 CELAC, the Community of Latin American and Caribbean States, a regional bloc
 Celac River, a tributary of the Câlneș River in Romania
 Sergiu Celac (born 1939), Romanian diplomat
 Mariana Celac, Romanian member of the non-governmental organization Group for Social Dialogue
 Conférence Episcopale du Laos et du Cambodge (CELAC), the Episcopal Conference of Laos and Cambodia